MOS:EL has no article.

In Wikipedia editing, the intended destination might be one of these guideline or Manual of Style pages:
 Wikipedia:External links (WP:EL)
 Wikipedia:Manual of Style/Embedded lists
 Wikipedia:Manual of Style/Layout#External links (summary version)
 Wikipedia:Manual of Style/Linking#External links section (long version)
 Wikipedia:Manual of Style/Television#Episode listing
 Wikipedia:Naming conventions (Greek), from its "el" language code